William Robert Guerin (born November 9, 1970) is an American former professional ice hockey player and the current general manager of the Minnesota Wild. He previously was the assistant general manager of the Pittsburgh Penguins and general manager of the Wilkes-Barre/Scranton Penguins.

Guerin played 18 seasons in the National Hockey League (NHL), winning two Stanley Cup championships with the New Jersey Devils and Pittsburgh Penguins.

Internationally, Guerin represented the United States in the Olympics in 1998, 2002 and 2006, and participated in two Ice Hockey World Championships. Guerin is the first player of Hispanic descent to play in the NHL.

Playing career

Professional

Guerin was drafted in the 1989 NHL Entry Draft fifth overall by the New Jersey Devils and played with the team from 1991 to 1998, winning the Stanley Cup in 1995. Midway through the 1997–98 season, Guerin was traded (along with Valeri Zelepukin) to the Edmonton Oilers in exchange for Jason Arnott and Bryan Muir.

In November 2001 Guerin was traded to his hometown team, the Boston Bruins.

After a 41-goal season (combined between Edmonton and Boston) in 2001–02, Guerin left the Bruins as a free agent and signed a five-year contract with the Dallas Stars. He performed below expectations during his tenure with the Stars. After a disappointing season in 2005–06 in which he recorded just 40 points, Dallas opted to buy-out the remainder of his contract. The conditions of buyouts in the NHL meant that the Stars would have to pay him two-thirds of the remaining salary on his contract spread out over twice as many years; this meant $6.7 million over one year became $4.4 million over two years.

On July 3, 2006, Guerin signed a one-year, $2 million contract with the St. Louis Blues. Playing on a line with former Oiler teammate Doug Weight, Guerin revived his career, easily eclipsing his disappointing goal-scoring mark from the 2005–06 season. He was named to the 2007 All-Star Game (hosted by the Stars) to represent the Blues. Despite numerous criticisms of his play during his time as a Star, Guerin received a standing ovation from the Dallas fans in recognition as his status as a longtime fan favorite.

On February 2, 2007, Guerin became the 214th NHL player to play in 1,000 games. Later that month, he was traded to the San Jose Sharks in exchange for Ville Nieminen, prospect Jay Barriball and a conditional first-round pick (either New Jersey's in 2007 or San Jose's in 2008). During the subsequent off-season, Guerin signed a two-year contract with the New York Islanders. On July 9, 2007, he was named captain of the Islanders, making him the 11th captain in team history.

On March 4, 2009, Guerin was traded to the Pittsburgh Penguins in exchange for a conditional draft pick. The pick, a 2009 fourth-round pick if the Penguins made the playoffs, was later turned into a 2009 third-round pick once the Penguins advanced to the second round of the 2009 Stanley Cup playoffs. Guerin won the Stanley Cup on June 12, 2009, with the Penguins, defeating the Detroit Red Wings by a final score of 2–1 for Game 7 at Joe Louis Arena. His 14 years between Stanley Cups as a player was the third-longest wait in NHL history, behind Chris Chelios (16) and Mark Recchi (15).

After vocal encouragement for his return from the crowd and teammates at Pittsburgh's Stanley Cup parade on June 15, as well as expressing his own affection for the city and team, Guerin signed a one-year contract extension with the Penguins on June 29 at a greatly reduced salary to play through the 2009–10 season. He became the first player to have a 20-goal season with seven different teams and one of only three to have a 20-goal season with five or more different teams (the two others being Eddie Shack and Ray Sheppard). Ray Shero, the general manager for the Penguins opted not to offer Guerin a contract for the 2010–11 season. On September 7, 2010, the Philadelphia Flyers invited Guerin to try out at training camp, but on October 4, the Flyers released him prior to the start of the regular season.

On December 6, 2010, Guerin announced his retirement as a player from the NHL as a Pittsburgh Penguin. At the time of his retirement, Guerin ranked seventh all-time among Americans in the NHL with 429 goals.

Management career
On June 6, 2011, the Penguins hired Guerin as their player development coach. On June 6, 2014, Penguins general manager Jim Rutherford announced that Guerin would be promoted to assistant general manager of the team. Rutherford said that Guerin would be focusing on developing the analytical side of the game. Following consecutive Stanley Cup triumphs in 2016 and 2017, the Penguins announced that Guerin's duties would expand to include the role of general manager of their American Hockey League (AHL) affiliate, the Wilkes-Barre/Scranton Penguins, made vacant via the departure of Jason Botterill to the NHL's Buffalo Sabres.

On August 21, 2019, Guerin was named the fourth general manager of the Minnesota Wild.
On March 21, 2022, Guerin was named the TSN TradeCentre GM of the Day, for his transactions at the 2022 NHL Trade Deadline.

Sexual assault coverup allegation
In a lawsuit filed on November 3, 2020, in Pennsylvania, it was alleged that Guerin played a role in covering up an alleged sexual assault on the wife of Wilkes-Barre/Scranton Penguins assistant coach Jarrod Skalde by the team's head coach Clark Donatelli. The lawsuit, Skalde et al. v. Lemieux Group, L.P. et al., alleges that Guerin, then the general manager of the Wilkes-Barre/Scranton Penguins, "told Skalde to keep quiet about the alleged assault." Guerin denied any wrongdoing on his part, claiming that he had "promptly brought (the allegation) to Pittsburgh Penguins senior management".<ref>https://www.startribune.com/whistleblower-lawsuit-against-pittsburgh-penguins-mentions-wild-gm-bill-guerin/573336391/</ 
Retrieved May 8, 2021</ref> The lawsuit remained open as of May 6, 2021 and was being litigated in the 
Pennsylvania Middle District Court with Judge Jennifer P Wilson presiding over the case.

The United States Center for SafeSport opened an investigation on Guerin over his alleged role in the whistleblower lawsuit.  If the SafeSport investigation concludes Guerin acted improperly, he could be suspended or terminated from his post as assistant GM of the U.S. Olympic Men’s Hockey team.

Personal life
Guerin was born in Worcester, Massachusetts, and raised in Wilbraham, Massachusetts. He attended Wilbraham & Monson Academy, and played junior hockey for the Springfield Olympics in lieu of high school hockey. Guerin is of Nicaraguan and Irish descent.

Guerin and his wife Kara have four children and reside in Eden Prairie, Minnesota. They previously lived in Moorestown, New Jersey during his tenure with the Devils.

Awards and achievements
NCAA (Hockey East) Champion 1990
Member of four Stanley Cup-winning teams: New Jersey Devils (1995); Pittsburgh Penguins (2009 as a player,  2016 and 2017 as Assistant GM)
Selected to four NHL All-Star Games: 2001, 2003, 2004, 2007
Named the MVP of the 2001 NHL All-Star Game
NHL second team All-Star: 2002
NHL Most Game Winning Goals (10): 2004
 United States Hockey Hall of Fame 2013

Career statistics

Regular season and playoffs

International

Transactions
June 17, 1989 – New Jersey Devils' first-round draft choice, fifth overall, in the 1989 NHL Entry Draft;
January 4, 1998 – Traded by the New Jersey Devils, along with Valeri Zelepukin, to the Edmonton Oilers in exchange for Jason Arnott and Bryan Muir;
November 15, 2000 – Traded by the Edmonton Oilers to the Boston Bruins in exchange for Anson Carter, Boston's 2001 first-round draft choice (Aleš Hemský) and Boston's 2001 second-round draft choice (Doug Lynch);
July 3, 2002 – Signed as a free agent by the Dallas Stars;
July 3, 2006 – Signed as a free agent by the St. Louis Blues;
February 27, 2007 – Traded by the St. Louis Blues to the San Jose Sharks in exchange for Ville Nieminen, Jay Barriball and New Jersey's 2007 first-round draft choice (David Perron);
July 5, 2007 – Signed as a free agent by the New York Islanders;
March 4, 2009 – Traded by the New York Islanders to the Pittsburgh Penguins in exchange for Pittsburgh's 2009 third-round draft choice (pick traded to Phoenix).

See also
List of NHL players with 1,000 games played

References

External links

1970 births
American men's ice hockey right wingers
American people of Irish descent
American people of Nicaraguan descent
Boston Bruins players
Boston College Eagles men's ice hockey players
Dallas Stars players
Edmonton Oilers players
Ice hockey people from Massachusetts
Ice hockey players at the 1998 Winter Olympics
Ice hockey players at the 2002 Winter Olympics
Ice hockey players at the 2006 Winter Olympics
Living people
Medalists at the 2002 Winter Olympics
Minnesota Wild executives
National Hockey League All-Stars
National Hockey League first-round draft picks
New Jersey Devils draft picks
New Jersey Devils players
New York Islanders players
Olympic silver medalists for the United States in ice hockey
People from Moorestown, New Jersey
People from Wilbraham, Massachusetts
Pittsburgh Penguins coaches
Pittsburgh Penguins executives
Pittsburgh Penguins players
San Jose Sharks players
Sports controversies
St. Louis Blues players
Stanley Cup champions
United States Hockey Hall of Fame inductees
Utica Devils players
Wilbraham & Monson Academy alumni
Ice hockey people from Worcester, Massachusetts